Ballophilus mauritianus is a species of centipede in the genus Ballophilus. It is found in Mauritius.

References 

Ballophilidae